Moana-Nui-a-Kiwa Ngarimu VC (7 April 1918 – 27 March 1943) was a New Zealand soldier and posthumous recipient of the Victoria Cross (VC), the highest award for gallantry in the face of the enemy that can be awarded to British and Commonwealth forces. He was the first Māori person to be awarded the VC. He was killed in action during Operation Supercharge II; part of the Tunisian campaign of World War II.

Early life
A Māori of Ngāti Porou and Te Whānau-ā-Apanui descent, Moana-Nui-a-Kiwa Ngārimu was born on 7 April 1918 in Whareponga in the East Coast region. He was one of ten children of Hāmuera Meketū Ngārimu, and his wife Maraea. The prominent tribal leader Materoa Reedy was his aunt. He was initially educated at Whareponga Native School but when the family moved to Pōhatukura, near Ruatoria, he attended Hiruhārama Native School. From 1933 to 1934, he went Te Aute College at Poukawa in Hawkes Bay, becoming well regarded at rugby. After completing his fourth form year, he worked as a shepherd on his father's sheep farm.

Second World War
Following the outbreak of the Second World War, Ngarimu joined the 2nd New Zealand Expeditionary Force on 11 February 1940, volunteering for the 28th (Māori) Battalion. The battalion, which embarked in May 1940 as part of the second echelon of the 2nd New Zealand Division was destined for the Middle East to join the first echelon, but instead was diverted to England in May 1940 where it formed part of the island's defence against a possible German invasion. The battalion eventually arrived in Egypt in March 1941.

Ngarimu served through the battles of Greece and Crete after which he participated with the battalion during the North African Campaign. Commissioned in April 1942, he served for a time as an intelligence officer before being given command of his own platoon.

By March 1943, the campaign in Africa had moved to Tunisia. The 2nd Division, of which the Māori battalion was part, was tasked with the capture of the Tebaga Gap, which disrupted otherwise mountainous terrain.  Several hills overlooked the gap, which itself was forced relatively easy, although several hills remained in German hands. One such hill was Point 209, held by the 2nd Battalion, 433 Panzer Grenadier Regiment of the 164th Light Division. Ngarimu's company was allocated the objective of the capture of Point 209.  On the afternoon of 26 March, he led his men up the slope and captured what was believed to be the top of Point 209, although it transpired to be a false summit and a feature lower on the slopes of Point 209. Fierce fighting transpired as the Germans attempted to drive Ngarimu's forces off the hill.  Twice wounded, he and his men defended their position from several counter-attacks during the night. His position reinforced the following morning, he was killed during the next counter-attack.

The false summit remained in the hands of Ngarimu's company, and the Germans still on Point 209 itself surrendered the same day once artillery support had been brought to bear on Point 209. Ngarimu is buried in Sfax War Cemetery, Tunisia.

Victoria Cross citation
 
The citation for Ngarimu's VC was published in the London Gazette and read:

The medal
The medal was presented to his parents by the Governor General of New Zealand, Sir Cyril 
Newall, at a hui at Ruatoria on 6 October 1943 attended by government leaders, diplomatic representatives and local people. The first of only two Victoria Crosses awarded to Māori, it was displayed in Gisborne in the Tairawhiti Museum’s Price of Citizenship Gallery. He is commemorated by a scholarship promoting education of Māori, and also in the World War II Hall of Memories at the Auckland War Memorial Museum. There is also a plaque honouring him in Queen's Garden in Dunedin.

Notes

References

External links
 Entry in the Encyclopedia of New Zealand (1966)
 Second Lieutenant M.N.K. Ngarimu in The Art of War exhibition at the UK National Archives
  (brief biography details)

1918 births
1943 deaths
New Zealand military personnel
New Zealand Māori farmers
New Zealand World War II recipients of the Victoria Cross
New Zealand military personnel killed in World War II
People from the Gisborne District
New Zealand Army officers
Ngāti Porou people
New Zealand Māori soldiers
Burials at Sfax War Cemetery